Winterthur Central Sports Hall, known AXA-Arena for sponsorship reasons, is an indoor sports arena, home to handball club Pfadi Winterthur and floorball club HC Rychenberg Winterthur. It can also be adopted to host basketball.

References

Indoor arenas in Switzerland
Handball venues in Switzerland
Sports venues completed in 2018
Sports venues in Switzerland
Winterthur
21st-century architecture in Switzerland